Otago Spur is a small spur projecting northward from the Buckeye Table, west of Discovery Ridge, Ohio Range. Mapped by United States Geological Survey (USGS) from surveys and U.S. Navy aerial photographs, 1958–59. The spur was studied by a New Zealand Antarctic Research Program (NZARP) geological party, 1983–84, and named after Otago University, the alma mater of Jonathan Aitchison, a member of the field party.

Ridges of Marie Byrd Land